This is a list of Greek football transfers in the summer transfer window 2010 by club.

Superleague

AEK Athens FC

In:

Out:

Aris Thessaloniki FC

In:

Out:

Asteras Tripoli F.C.

In:

Out:

Atromitos F.C.

In:

Out:

Ergotelis F.C.

In:

Out:

Iraklis Thessaloniki F.C.

In:

Out:

Kavala F.C.

In:

Out:

Kerkyra F.C.

In:

Out:

Larissa F.C.

In:

Out:

Olympiacos F.C.

In:

Out:

Ethnikos Olympiakos Volos F.C.

In:

Out:

Panathinaikos F.C.

In:

Out:

Panionios G.S.S.

In:

Out:

Panserraikos F.C.

In:

Out:

P.A.O.K. F.C.

In:

Out:

Skoda Xanthi F.C..

In:

Out:

References

External links
 Contra.gr
 Sport24.gr
 Balleto.gr

Greek
2010–11 in Greek football
2010